Mohammad Khalid Siddiqui  is a Nepali politician belonging to People's Socialist Party, Nepal. He is also member of Rastriya Sabha and was elected under open category.

Reference

Living people
Year of birth missing (living people)
People from Siraha District
Members of the National Assembly (Nepal)